Juan Luis Gómez López (born 8 May 1980), commonly known as Juanlu, is a Spanish former footballer who played as a left midfielder.

In a professional career that lasted 14 years, he amassed La Liga totals of 122 matches and 14 goals over seven seasons, representing in the competition Numancia, Betis, Osasuna and Levante. He added 136 games and 25 goals in the Segunda División.

Club career

Beginnings
Born in Málaga, Juanlu began his career at amateurs CD Don Benito and Mármol Macael CD before moving to neighbouring UD Almería of Segunda División, being first-choice in his first season but only a backup – seven games, none complete – in the second.

During his time at the Andalusia side, Juanlu also had a loan stint at Alicante CF in the Segunda División B.

Betis
Juanlu made his La Liga debut in the 2004–05 campaign, playing 27 league matches for CD Numancia (two goals, scoring against Real Betis in the league opener on 28 August, in a 1–1 home draw) before moving to Betis upon Numancia's relegation.

During his time at the Verdiblancos, Juanlu was loaned to Albacete Balompié and CA Osasuna. Unhappy at his lack of first team opportunities at the Seville club, he showed satisfaction upon his move to Navarre: "I am happy because this deal is good for everyone, especially for me because I've joined a team that's in the Champions League qualifying round." He was relatively used in the league, and added six appearances with two goals in the UEFA Cup, including the only in the second leg of the quarter-finals against Bayer 04 Leverkusen.

In July 2007, again on loan, Juanlu joined another second division side, Córdoba CF, netting five goals during the season as they barely avoided relegation. He returned to Betis in July 2008, and was told to look for a new club.

Levante
After one year out of football, training with Betis but not registered, Juanlu broke ties with Betis on 12 June 2009, moving to Levante UD on a one-year deal on 28 July. In his first season, the veteran enjoyed his best professional year, scoring for the first time in double digits as the Valencian Community team returned to the top division after two years.

Juanlu appeared in 28 games in 2010–11 as Levante retained their league status, netting three times. On 23 October 2011 he scored a brace in a 3–0 away win over Villarreal CF, with his team leading the league early into the campaign. In late December, however, whilst playing against Deportivo de La Coruña in the Copa del Rey, he suffered fibula and ankle ligament fracture after a challenge by Borja, going on to be sidelined for three months.

Juanlu scored twice in 2012–13, in another escape from relegation. One of those goals came on 26 May 2013 at the San Mamés Stadium in a 1–0 defeat of Athletic Bilbao, in what was the last goal ever in the ground. Late into the season he, alongside Sergio Ballesteros and Gustavo Munúa, was accused by teammate José Barkero of lack of commitment during a 0–4 home loss to Deportivo, which led to several match fixing allegations.

Later years
On 27 August 2013, aged 33, Juanlu moved abroad for the first time in his career, joining compatriot Jonan García at newly promoted Greek club Kalloni FC. After being sparingly used he returned to Spain, joining Córdoba CF on 21 January of the following year. He appeared in 16 competitive matches during the campaign, which ended in top-division promotion after a 42-year absence.

References

External links

1980 births
Living people
Spanish footballers
Footballers from Málaga
Association football midfielders
La Liga players
Segunda División players
Segunda División B players
CD Don Benito players
UD Almería players
Alicante CF footballers
CD Numancia players
Real Betis players
Albacete Balompié players
CA Osasuna players
Córdoba CF players
Levante UD footballers
Super League Greece players
AEL Kalloni F.C. players
Spanish expatriate footballers
Expatriate footballers in Greece
Spanish expatriate sportspeople in Greece